Spencer Lam Sheung Yee (14 December 1934 – 23 April 2009) was a football defender, coach and announcer, as well as an actor.

Spencer was a graduate of the Chinese University of Hong Kong with an economics major.  He was once a secondary school teacher in Hong Kong while working as a voice actor on television advertisements and a football player. At an international level, he represented the Republic of China in 1960 Olympics football in Rome.

Football career
As a footballer, he was nicknamed  due to his powerful clearances and long-range free kicks from between 20 and 40 yards), but it also had a lot to do with the materials used on the match balls are a lot heavier than the ones being used nowadays. He also had another nickname .  He represented Republic of China instead of Hong Kong, despite both teams being founding members of the Asian Football Confederation in 1954.

Honours
 1958 Asian Games - Football Champion (Republic of China)
 1971/72 Hong Kong Senior Challenge Shield Champion (Hong Kong Rangers FC)
 1971/72 Hong Kong First Division League Champion (Hong Kong Rangers FC)
 3x Asian Football Confederation winners

Acting career
 
He also developed an acting career garnering 48 credits from 1992 to 2004. He is most remembered for roles in Young And Dangerous where he played a priest and Karen Mok's father, Sunshine Cops and Your Place Or Mine.

Partial filmography

 Fight Back to School II (1992) - Judo Teacher
 Gameboy Kids (1992) - Police Captain
 Murder (1993) - Jessica's Boss
 Gwok chaan Ling Ling Chat (1994) - Football Commentator (voice)
 Dream Lover (1995) - Television Commentator
 Young and Dangerous (1996) - Father Lam
 Sexy and Dangerous (1996) - Fly Head
 Young and Dangerous 2 (1996) - Father Lam
 Satan Returns (1996) - The Reverend
 Once Upon a Time in Triad Society (1996) - Sheung-Yee
 Street Angels (1996) - Barrister Lam
 Big Bullet (1996) - Dan
 Young and Dangerous 3 (1996) - Father Lam
 Feel 100% (1996) - Principal
 War of the Underworld (1996) - Mao
 Da nei mi tan zhi ling ling xing xing (1996) - Sun Ng-Hung / Lam Sheung-Yee
 Bodyguards of the Last Governor (1996) - Bao
 Rebekah (1996)
 Till Death Do Us Laugh (1996) - Yan
 Passionate Nights (1997) - Head of Security Agency
 Black Rose II (1997) - Lui Kei
 Young and Dangerous 4 (1997) - Father Lam
 Lawyer Lawyer (1997) - Priest
 Killing Me Tenderly (1997) - Su-Kan's Superior
 We're No Bad Guys (1997) - Bomb Squad Man
 03:00 A.M. (1997) - Dr. Tso
 Chao ji wu di zhui nu zai 2 zhi gou zai xiong xin (1997)
 Midnight Zone (1997) - Uncle Seven (first segment)
 Beyond Time Space Want Love (1998)
 B gai waak (1998) - Lam
 Haunted Mansion (1998) - The Professor
 Your Place or Mine! (1998) - Leung Shiu, Wai's Father (Simon)
 Wai Goh dik goo si (1998)
 The Conman (1998) - Football commentator
 Afraid of Nothing, the Jobless King (1999)
 Prince Charming (1999) - Wah's Dad
 Horoscope 1: The Voice from Hell (1999) - Jojo's Grandfather
 The Sunshine Cops (1999) - H2O's father
 My Loving Trouble 7 (1999)
 Born to Be King (2000) - Father Lam
 Blue Moon (2001)
 You Shoot, I Shoot (2001) - Mr. Tse
 Women from Mars (2002)
 The Twins Effect (2003) - Jackie's father
 Dragon Loaded 2003 (2003) - Gold's father
 Fantasia (2004) - TV commentator
 Herbal Tea (2004) - Tinibal Carl Chiu (final film role)

References

External links
 
 

1934 births
2009 deaths
Association football commentators
Association football defenders
Footballers at the 1960 Summer Olympics
Olympic footballers of Taiwan
Chinese Taipei international footballers
Chinese Taipei international footballers from Hong Kong
Taiwanese footballers
Hong Kong First Division League players
Hong Kong footballers
Hong Kong male television actors
Hong Kong male voice actors
Hong Kong television presenters
Hong Kong male film actors
Asian Games medalists in football
Footballers at the 1958 Asian Games
Asian Games gold medalists for Chinese Taipei
Medalists at the 1958 Asian Games
1968 AFC Asian Cup players
Yuen Long FC players
Kitchee SC players
Eastern Sports Club footballers
Hong Kong Rangers FC players
Alumni of the Chinese University of Hong Kong